United Faith Christian Academy (UFCA) is a private, accredited, college-preparatory Christian school for children in Pre-Kindergarten to 12th grade that was founded in 1985.  UFCA strives to inspire students to be leaders, thinkers and Christians who are confident in their faith.  UFCA offers challenging curriculum taught from a biblical worldview and provide a space for all student's to discover their God-given talents.  UFCA is committed to impact the world for Christ by educating the hearts, minds and bodies through the passionate teaching of a Christ-centered curriculum in a Christ-centered environment. Its two-building facility is located in Charlotte, NC.

References 

Christian schools in North Carolina
Educational institutions established in 1985
Private high schools in North Carolina
Private middle schools in North Carolina
Private elementary schools in North Carolina
Schools in Charlotte, North Carolina
1985 establishments in North Carolina